Aleksandar Glišić may refer to:

 Aleksandar Glišić (footballer) (born 1992), Bosnian footballer
 Aleksandar Glišić (soldier) (1873–1912), lieutenant colonel of the Serbian army
 Aleksandar Glišić (basketball) (born 1968), Serbian basketball coach (Beopetrol, Leotar Trebinje, Vizura) and former player (Partizan, IMT, Beopetrol)
 Aleksandar Glišić (basketball referee) (born 1973), Serbian basketball referee (2019 FIBA Basketball World Cup, 2020 Summer Olympics)